Anne Neely (born 1946) is a painter based in Boston, Massachusetts and Maine, USA. She paints abstract paintings with a current emphasis on landscapes and nature. She uses paint to explore uncharted territories and imagined landscapes.

Neely has won multiple awards for her work. She has had residencies abroad, such as the Ballinglen Arts Foundation Fellowship Program in Ireland. The artist's work has been shown in galleries and museums across the United States and can be found in the collections of Armand Hammer Museum, Brooklyn Museum, Davis Museum and Cultural Center of Wellesley College, DeCordova Museum and Sculpture Park, The Farnesworth Art Museum, Grenwald Center for Graphic Arts at UCLA, Museum of Fine Arts, Boston, National Gallery of Art, Washington, DC, Rose Art Museum of Brandeis University, The Smithsonian's The National Museum of American Art, Whitney Museum of American Art.

In 2014, her multimedia exhibition, Water Stories: Conversations in Paint and Sound, opened at the Museum of Science, Boston.

Neely was a teacher at Milton Academy in Milton, Massachusetts from 1974 to 2012, where she also served as director of the Nesto Gallery twice.

References

External links
 Official website
 Biography and works
 Catalog for Mopang: Recent Paintings, at the Lohin Geduld Gallery, New York, NY

People from Milton, Massachusetts
Living people
1946 births
American women painters
Painters from Massachusetts
Abstract painters
20th-century American painters
20th-century American women artists
21st-century American women artists